Comfort Cove-Newstead is a small fishing community located outside Campbellton, on the east coast of Newfoundland and Labrador, Canada, (on the Bay of Exploits).

It has a recently renovated town hall, a fire department, a corner store with post office, two churches, and other services including a fish processing plant and a vegetable farm.

There are many services such as a playground, town hall, community center, fish plant, fire hall, local store, vegetable farm and more. The children in this town, along with those from Campbellton, Birchy Bay, Baytona, Loon Bay and Michaels Harbour attend a k-9 school in the Campbellton and high school in Lewisporte.

There are about 248 private dwellings, in Comfort Cove-Newstead, covering a land area of about 29.83 square km.  There is a Salvation Army place of worship, a United Church, and Cull's Point Cemetery there.

Demographics 

Climate

References

Populated coastal places in Canada
Towns in Newfoundland and Labrador